CTL Logistics is a Polish rail JSC company operating mainly in freight transport. It consist of several dependent companies responsible for different areas of railway business. It is the biggest private railway company in Poland.

Share in local market
CTL Logistics operates 138 km. of own rail tracks and total of 660 km. of all tracks in the system. The company owns 165 locomotives and 4.400 freight cars. In 2005 it transported over 40.000.000 tons of cargo, achieving share of 33% in private railway market.

Rolling stock
CTL uses mostly PKP class ET22, PKP class ET21, PKP class ST43 and PKP class ST44 locomotives. The company distinguishes its locomotives from PKP and other railways by painting them in blue and white colours, with orange front and a white logo positioned on the sides of body. Since 2007, CTL uses black and silver as its new company colours.

History
CTL Logistics emerges from Chem Trans Logic company, who started operation  in 1992, taking care of mainly chemicals transport. Fast development succeeded in starting a CTL Group holding with several Polish and German companies as participants. On the brink of 2004 and 2005 the company changed name to CTL Logistics.

Dependent companies
Following companies operate as holding members (joining year in brackets): CTL Północ (1993), CTL Południe (1994), CTL Logistics GmbH (1995), CTL Wagony, CTL Polski Koks Spedycja (1996), Panopa Polska, CTL Tankpol, CTL Chemkol, CTL Agencja Celna (2000), CTL Maczki-Bór (2002), CTL Rail, CTL Rail GmbH, CTL Kolzap, CTL Trans-port (2004), CTL Kargo Sp. z o.o. (2005),

See also
 Transportation in Poland
 List of railway companies
 Polish locomotives designation

Notes
 Notice, that CTL is already an abbreviation from Chem Trans Logic.

External links

 , URL accessed at 1 March 2009
 Companies Press Office's website, URL accessed at 16 July 2006

Railway companies of Poland
Railway companies established in 1992
Companies based in Warsaw
Polish companies established in 1992
Polish Limited Liability Companies